is a Japanese football player who plays as Midfielder and currently play for J3 League club, FC Imabari.

Career
From 2015, Kazaki Nakagawa played for Spanish clubs Vallecas and Betis San Isidro. In August 2017, he moved back to Japan and joined J3 League side FC Ryukyu.   He helped the Okinawans gain promotion to J2 League in 2018 and was snapped up by J1 side Yokohama F. Marinos in March 2019.

Club statistics
Updated to 15 March 2019.

References

External links
Profile at FC Ryukyu

Profile at FC Imabari

1995 births
Living people
Kanto Gakuin University alumni
Association football people from Saitama Prefecture
Japanese footballers
J1 League players
J2 League players
J3 League players
FC Ryukyu players
Yokohama F. Marinos players
Kyoto Sanga FC players
FC Imabari players
Association football midfielders